Bhogole may refer to:

Bhogole, West Godavari district, a village in West Godavari district, Andhra Pradesh, India
Bogole, Nellore district, a village in Nellore district, Andhra Pradesh, India
Bhogole, Prakasam district, a village in Prakasam district, Andhra Pradesh, India